Jewell is an unincorporated community in Clatsop County, Oregon, United States. The logging community is located at the junction of Oregon Route 103 and Oregon Route 202, near the Nehalem River.

History

Jewell was named after Marshall Jewell, United States Postmaster General from 1874–1876. A post office was established in Jewell in 1874 and closed in 1967.

Natural history
Jewell is situated near the Clatsop State Forest. Jewell Meadows Wildlife Area is a wildlife preserve near Jewell run by the Oregon Department of Fish and Wildlife. It is known for its Roosevelt elk.

The world's largest Bigleaf Maple, as determined by the National Register of Big Trees, with a height of 101 feet and a spread of 90 feet, was located near Jewell, but fell during a windstorm in 2011.

Education
Students from grades kindergarten through twelfth grade attend Jewell School, the only school in the Jewell School District.

References

External links
Image of Jewell Grange hall from waymarking.com
Jewell Meadows Wildlife Area
Jewell history from VanNatta Forestry

Unincorporated communities in Clatsop County, Oregon
1874 establishments in Oregon
Populated places established in 1874
Unincorporated communities in Oregon
Logging communities in the United States